Isidore Ostrer (1889–1975) was a banker, financier, poet, newspaper owner, and film studio owner in England. His father, Nathan Ostrer, was a jewellery salesman who immigrated from the Russian Empire. In addition to assembling a media empire he wrote poetry and authored an economics text.

Isidore Ostrer began his career in the textile industry before establishing two banks with his brothers. They financed film industry businesses and Ostrer acquired control of Gaumont-British Film Company from its French parent Gaumont Film Company in 1922. He sold it to J. Arthur Rank in 1941. Ostrer also owned a newspaper (Sunday Referee) and textile business (Amalgamated Textiles).

Ostrer was born in London's East End.

He moved to the U.S. during World War II. His daughter became actress Pamela Mason. Morgan Mason is his grandson.

A painting of Isidore Ostrer by Howard Coster is in the National Portrait Gallery.

Nigel Ostrer wrote The Ostrers and Gaumon British.

References

1889 births
1975 deaths
Bankers from London